Arumanoor is a village on the banks of the river Meenachil in Kerala, India. Situated between the towns of Ettumanoor and Ayarkunnam, the village has a population of 2000.

Landmarks

Major landmarks in the village include the State Bank of Travancore, Pattarmadom bridge, Arumanoor shappu, Mangalavartha Church, PCZ Latex Company, Kuncherakkattil Crusher, Arangathu Crusher, Minerwell Drinking water company, Paarekkadavu ferry, Theeppetty company, Goorkkandassary kavala and the great temple of Sri Krishna, which dates back to the 15th century.

History
Legend has it that the temple sported a copper-based flag tower that was covered with beaten sheets of gold. However, during the Islamic ransacking of Kerala by Mysore king Tipu Sultan the Nairs of all the surrounding villages dismantled the tower and laid it down in the depths of Meenachil river fearing its safety. Locals claim the post to be still visible in the river.  Arumanoor Mangalavartha Church is also famous for its structural beauty.

Economy
The village has a post office, hospital, school, bank, Latex Company, Crusher, Mineral water plant, Tappuzha water supply project. Sugarcane processing facility, internet facilities and a Vayasan club [Old men's club].

References

Villages in Kottayam district